Chitral is situated on the Chitral River in northern Khyber Pakhtunkhwa, Pakistan. It serves as the capital of the Chitral District and before that as the capital of Chitral princely state that encompassed the region until its direct incorporation into West Pakistan on 14 August 1947. It has a population of 49,780 per the 2017 census.

History 

This city was founded as the name of Qāshqār in ancient times. It was a Gandharan trade route at this time. Gankorineotek cemetery is also existed here.

Early history 
The Kho Chitralis came to Chitral as part of the Indo-Aryan migration into South Asia. They settled in the northern parts of Chitral near the Torkhow and Mulkhow Region.

Ancient era 
The existence of the Gandharan Grave Culture in Chitral, found in various grave sites scattered over its valleys, indicate its proximity towards the Gandharan culture alongside giving insightful knowledge of its inhabitants between the Indus Valley civilization era and the following Persian rule. Chitral is also associated with the Iron Age tribes known as Daradas. The Darada country stretched from Chitral in the west to the Kisanganga Valley in the north of Kashmir. The Daradas are said to have gone to war against Arjun according to the Hindu Epic Mahabharata. Chitral is also attributed to be the seat of the ancient realm of Kamboja, which contains mentions in Hindu epics.

The area which now forms Chitral was reportedly conquered by the Persian Achaemenids and was a part of one of their easternmost satraps. Chitrali culture and vocabulary is heavily influenced by Persian and is said to show a mix of both Avestan and Sanskrit. In the third century CE, Kanishka, the Buddhist ruler of the Kushan empire, occupied Chitral. Under the Kushans, many Buddhist monuments were built around the area, mainly Buddhist stupas and monasteries. The Kushans also patronised Buddhist art; some of the finest examples of the image of Buddha were produced in the region under the Kushan rule.

Kator era 
From 1571 to 1947, Chitral was the dominion of the Kator Dynasty. The British and Sikh garrison suffered a siege by the Chitralis, possibly aided by Afghan forces, in 1895. The garrison was relieved after six weeks, and the British installed the young Shuja ul-Mulk as Mehtar ("ruler"). He ruled for the next 41 years.

Accession to Pakistan 
In 1947, following the division of the British colony of India, princely states were offered the choice to either remain independent or to choose one of the two new dominions. The Mehtar of Chitral, who was a friend of Quaid E Azam Mohammad Ali Jinnah, acceded to Pakistan and thus Chitral became one of the princely states of Pakistan. In 1969 it was fully integrated into Pakistan as the administrative district of Chitral.

Role in the First Kashmir War 
Chitral played an instrumental role in the 1947–1948 first Kashmir war. Immediately after acceding to Pakistan, Mehtar Muzaffar ul-Mulk proclaimed Jihad to "liberate" Kashmir from the Dogras. At this point, the Gilgit scouts were retreating and the Dogra forces had made gains in the Burzil pass. Under these circumstances, the Chitral scouts relieved the Gilgit scouts in Domel and Kamri sectors whilst the Chitral Bodyguard force went towards Skardu. The Chitral bodyguards under the leadership of a Chitral Prince laid one of the longest sieges in military history which ended with the fall of Skardu, the surrender of the Dogras, and the capture of Baltistan. During this time, the Chitral scouts assimilated with the Gilgit scouts and went on towards taking the Kargil pass.

Geography 

Climate 
Chitral has a warm-summer humid continental climate (Köppen: Dfb), closely bordering on a dry-summer continental climate (Köppen: Dsb) with warm, dry summers and very cold winters with heavy snowfall occurring routinely in Chitral Valley. Cold spells that have swept across Chitral can be deadly as locals have died of the extreme numbing temperatures in the past. Chitral is known for its snowfall and deadly avalanches. The road that goes towards Chitral is very dangerous as it's one of the most narrow roads in the world, and it is situated in the world's largest mountain range. It is designed to be a one-lane road but it is used as a two-lane road.

Demographics 

Urdu is the official language of the city. According to the 1981 census, Khowar is the main language and is spoken by 98% of the population. Kalasha is also spoken by a small population.

As per the 2017 census, Chitral has a population of 49,780.

Educational institutions
 University of Chitral

Notable people 

 Falak Naz Chitrali (Member of Senate of Pakistan)
 Wazir Zada (Member of Provincial Assembly of KPK)

See also 
 Chitral Tehsil

References

Bibliography

Further reading

External links 

 
 Government of Khyber-Pakhtunkhwa
 Khyber-Pakhtunkhwa Government website section on Lower Dir
 United Nations

 
Chitral District
Tehsils of Chitral District
Union councils of Khyber Pakhtunkhwa
Populated places in Chitral District
Union councils of Chitral District
Hill stations in Pakistan
Populated places along the Silk Road